Østerøya (East Island) is one of two peninsulas outside Sandefjord, Norway. It borders in west to the Mefjord and east to the Tønsbergfjord. Tønsberg Barrel is located on the southern end of the peninsula. Tønsberg Barrel is an old beacon mentioned in Sverris saga. It has been described as one of the most beautiful sites in Sandefjord.

East Island lies between the Tønsbergfjord and Mefjord. It has a large number of beaches, campgrounds, recreational areas, and vacation homes. The peninsula has a length of 10 km, and is between 1 and 2 km in width. It was previously known as Yxnøy, a name which now is used for East Island’s southernmost point. Yxnøy, also spelled Yxney, is now a recreational area home to several beaches, forests, sloping rocks, hiking trails, and Tønsberg Barrel. The peninsula is now named East Island as it is located east of the Sandefjord city centre. The southern end of the peninsula contains public areas for outdoor activities, recreation, fishing and swimming. A preserved  area with black alder swamp forest (containing ramsons, iris pseudacorus and early purple orchid) is located here.

During the Viking Age, ocean water levels were three metres higher, which meant both Vesterøya- and Østerøya peninsulas were islands surrounded by ocean waters.

There are 20 km (12 mi.) of hiking trails on East Island, which is an extension of the 25 km (15 mi.) coastal path at West Island. Combined the 45 km (28 mi.) hiking trail is part of the international North Sea Trail.

Head Above Water ("Hodet over vannet") by film director Nils Gaup was filmed at the southern tip of Østerøya and features Ertsvika at Yxnøy.

Yxnøy

Yxnøy is one of the largest undeveloped areas found along the Vestfold coast. The 5-meter (16 ft.) tall Tønsberg Barrel is an old beacon mentioned in Sverris saga from around year 1200. Many ships have sunk near the landmark, which is located at Yxnøy (Yxney) on the southern tip of East Island. The seamark (navigation mark) sits on the mountain Tønneberget (Stenbåken) with ocean-views in all directions. It has an elevation of 37 meters (121 ft.) and marks the entry point for the city of Tønsberg. Its circumference is at its most 12 meters (39 ft.), and it is painted in white and black. The beacon originally consisted of a barrel, hence the name, but was replaced with the current seamark in 1900.

Yxnøy and the area surrounding Tønsberg Barrel were fortified by the German occupation forces during World War II. Bunkers, trenches and other remains from the war can still be seen in the surrounding area. A number of ships have also sunk here, including ships such as Wilhelm Tell in 1851 and Bjørgvin in 1961, which lies 70 meters from Tønsberg Barrel. In 1907, the ship Union sunk here and its crew of eight men drowned. The coastal hiking trail from Tønsberg Barrel to Skjellvika Beach is 9 km. It is part of the international North Sea Trail.

Yxnøy is the only place in Norway where the plant species  (Valeriana dioica) occurs. Strandvika Nature Preserve is located at Yxnøy. It is home to a black alder swamp forest containing ramsons, iris pseudacorus and early purple orchid. The nature preserve was established in 1980.

History
Østerøya was fortified during World War II.

Beaches

Beaches on East Island include:

 Skjellvika
 Flautangen
 Nordre Trubervika
 Strandvika
 Yxnøy
 Ertsvika
 Hagaløkka
 Tallakshavn

See also
Vesterøya (West Island)

References

Peninsulas of Vestfold og Telemark
Sandefjord